Pteraspidoidei is an extinct suborder of heterostracan vertebrates. It contains the more derived taxa within Pteraspidiformes, such as Pteraspis and Errivaspis, though, some protopteraspidids, such as Doryaspis and Panamintaspis, share various features with these derived pteraspidids.

References 

 Pernègre V., 2006. - Un nouveau pteraspidiforme (Vertebrata, Heterostraci) du Dévonien inférieur du Spitsberg: nouvelles données paléo-ontogéniques. Geodiversitas, fasc. 2, t. 28

Pteraspidiformes
Fish suborders
Devonian jawless fish
Silurian jawless fish
Prehistoric animal suborders
Silurian first appearances
Devonian extinctions